Patrick Darcy Hills  (31 December 1917 – 22 April 1992) was a New South Wales politician. He served in various high offices across the state most notably the Deputy Premier of New South Wales, Leader of the Opposition and as the Lord Mayor of Sydney.

Early life
Hills was born in the Sydney suburb of Surry Hills. He was educated at Marist Brothers High School, Darlinghurst and was apprenticed as an electrical engineer.

He was an alderman on Sydney City Council from 1948 to 1956 and Lord Mayor of Sydney from 1953 to 1956.

Political career
Hills was elected to the New South Wales Legislative Assembly as the member for Phillip in 1954, representing the Labor Party; he held the seat till its abolition in 1981.  Then, until 1988, he served as member for Elizabeth.

He was Minister for Local Government in the cabinet of Premier Robert Heffron (1959-1964). When Heffron retired in April 1964, Hills and Deputy Premier Jack Renshaw were considered the most likely successors, but his relative youth and manner compared to Renshaw was seen as an obstacle, as an article in The Bulletin noted: "Hills, who rose rapidly in the parliamentary party under the patronage of the late Joe Cahill, lists in “Who’s Who” one of his hobbies as “study of local government administration”, a demonstration of his essential dourness. He has the vice, for a politician, of not suffering fools gladly and it is this that feeds a habit of arrogance which has made him many unnecessary enemies."

In any event, Hills did not contest the leadership in the caucus ballot held on 29 April 1964, and Renshaw was elected leader and premier unopposed. Hills did however contest for the deputy premiership, and was successful 33 votes to 19 against health minister Bill Sheahan. 

Following Renshaw's departure from the Labor leadership, Hills was the State Opposition Leader from 1968 to 1973; at the 1971 and 1973 state elections he was narrowly defeated by the Liberal Premier, Sir Robert Askin.

During his long Parliamentary service of 34 years, Hills served terms as Deputy Premier and as Minister in a number of portfolios including Local Government, Highways, Mines, Energy, Industrial Relations, Technology, Roads and Employment. In opposition he served as Deputy Leader for three years and Leader for five years. His many notable initiatives and achievements as a Minister include the Sydney to Newcastle Highway, the construction of the Gladesville Bridge and establishment of the State Planning Authority now known as the NSW Department of Planning. One of his major achievements was the building of the Eraring and Bayswater power stations. He has been accused of sabotaging the 1948 Cumberland County Plan for Sydney, "flogging the green belt out the back door before the ink was dry".

Later life and career
He served as a member of the Sydney Cricket Ground and Sports Ground Trust from July 1961 to December 1989, and was Chairman of the Trust during its significant expansion period from 1977 to 1989. 
Until John Robertson's resignation in 2014, Hills was the only New South Wales Labor Leader not to have been premier since World War II.

Hills died in Sydney and was cremated with his ashes interred at Northern Suburbs Memorial Gardens.

Honours
Hills was made an Officer of the Order of Australia (AO) in the 1988 Australia Day Honours.

The suburb of Hillsdale, New South Wales is named after Hills.

References

|-

|-

|-

|-

|-

|-

|-

|-

|-

|-

1917 births
1992 deaths
Members of the New South Wales Legislative Assembly
Deputy Premiers of New South Wales
Officers of the Order of Australia
Mayors and Lord Mayors of Sydney
Leaders of the Opposition in New South Wales
Politicians from Sydney
Australian Labor Party members of the Parliament of New South Wales
Australian Labor Party councillors
20th-century Australian politicians
Councillors of Sydney County Council